Lwi Zar (born 2 February 1976) is a Burmese politician who currently serves as a House of Nationalities member of parliament for Kayah State No. 6 constituency.

Early life and education
Lwi Zar was born on 2 February 1976 in Demoso Township, Kayah State, Burma (Myanmar).

Political career
Lwi Zar is a member of the National League for Democracy. In the Myanmar general election, 2015, she was elected as an Amyotha Hluttaw MP, winning a majority of 2,576 votes and elected representative from Kayah State No. 6 parliamentary constituency. She also serves as a member of  Amyotha Hluttaw Health, Sports and Culture Committee.

References

National League for Democracy politicians
1976 births
Living people
People from Kayah State